Hamad Mubarak Al-Attiya (born 22 August 1972) is a Qatari footballer. He competed in the men's tournament at the 1992 Summer Olympics.

References

External links
 

1972 births
Living people
Qatari footballers
Qatar international footballers
Olympic footballers of Qatar
Footballers at the 1992 Summer Olympics
Place of birth missing (living people)
Association football defenders